The 1976–77 season was the 75th in the history of the Western Football League. The league was split into two divisions for the first time since 1959–60.

The league champions for the third time in their history, and the third season in succession, were Falmouth Town. The champions of the new Division One were newcomers Saltash United.

This season was the last in which goal average decided places for teams which were level on points.

Final tables

Premier Division
The new Premier Division was created from the top eighteen clubs in the old single division of the previous season.

First Division
The new First Division consisted of the bottom five clubs from the previous season, plus thirteen new clubs:

Brixham United, from the Plymouth & District League.
Chard Town, from the Somerset Senior League.
Clandown, rejoining after leaving in 1960.
Heavitree United
Ilminster Town
Larkhall Athletic
Ottery St Mary, from the South Western League.
Portway Bristol
Saltash United, from the South Western League.
Shepton Mallet Town, from the Somerset Senior League.
Swanage Town & Herston
Torquay United Reserves, rejoining after leaving in 1973.
Yeovil Town Reserves, rejoining after leaving in 1970.

References

1976-77
5